Uladzimir Hayew (born 28 October 1977), also known as Vladimir Gaev, is a Belarusian association football coach and former player (goalkeeper).

Career

Club
Hayew began his playing career with the home-town team MPKC, (which later changed its name to FC Slavia Mozyr), in the Belarusian Premier League. Playing first in the youth team, before making his senior team debut in 1996, the year they won their first championship. In 2000, he won the league championship with Slavia. After a brief loan spell at Zvyazda Minsk, he played his last season for Slavia in 2002, moving another Belarus club, Gomel. His only season there brought another championship medal, in 2003. That success brought the attention of the top Romanian club, Dinamo București, who signed him to a three-year deal in 2003. His first game for Dinamo came in the second half of the 2003/2004 season, in a game against Farul Constanţa on 24 April 2004; a game Dinamo won 2–1. That season he played only 2 games, but enough to earn a Championship medal. Gaev went on to play for 3 more seasons in Romania, winning the Romanian Cup in 2004 and 2005, as well as the Romanian Super Cup in 2005. He has also played in 11 European cup matches for Dinamo. In 2007, he was transferred to Chornomorets. After making only 2 senior team appearances for them, Gaev was sold to the Belarusian Premier League club Shakhtyor Soligorsk in the beginning of 2008. In the summer of 2008 he was loaned to another Premier League club, Savit Mogilev for the remainder of the season. During that 2008 season Hayew played 15 matches (allowing 26 goals), and the team was relegated after finishing in 15th place. The club folded and Gaev moved to FC Gomel for the 2009 season.

International career
Uladzimir Hayew has played for the Belarus national football team on 4 occasions. The most recent of which was a UEFA Euro 2008 qualifying game against Slovenia on 12 September 2007. He was recalled to the team, after a long absence, by the new head coach of Belarus, Bernd Stange.

Honors
Slavia Mozyr
Belarusian Premier League champion: 1996, 2000
Belarusian Cup winner: 1995–96, 1999–2000

Gomel
Belarusian Premier League champion: 2003
Belarusian Cup winner: 2010–11

Dinamo București
Liga I champion: 2003–04, 2006–07
Cupa României winner: 2003–04, 2004–05
Supercupa României winner: 2005

References

External links
 
 
 

1977 births
Living people
People from Mazyr
Sportspeople from Gomel Region
Belarusian footballers
Belarus international footballers
Belarusian expatriate footballers
FC Chornomorets Odesa players
FC Dinamo București players
Expatriate footballers in Romania
Expatriate footballers in Ukraine
Belarusian expatriate sportspeople in Ukraine
Liga I players
Ukrainian Premier League players
Association football goalkeepers
FC Gomel players
FC Savit Mogilev players
FC Slavia Mozyr players
FC Shakhtyor Soligorsk players
FC Energetik-BGU Minsk players